Kaderi Kibria is a Bangladeshi Rabindra Sangeet singer. Kibria was awarded Ekushey Padak in 2013 by the Government of Bangladesh.

Early life and career
Kibria was born in Faridpur Upazila in Pabna district of Bangladesh. He received music lessons from Ajit Roy and Debobrato Bishwas. In 1975 he went to Shantiniketan for post-graduation studies in Tagore songs. He was a member of Zinga Shilpi Goshthi. His first TV appearance was in 1967. His first record of two Tagore songs was released In 1969 by HMV.

He moved to United States in 1990s.

Discography
 Best of Kadri Kibra
 Purono Sai Diner Kotha
 Esho Hai Boishakh

Awards
Ekushey Padak (2013)

References

Living people
Year of birth missing (living people)
20th-century Bangladeshi male singers
20th-century Bangladeshi singers
Recipients of the Ekushey Padak
Rabindra Sangeet exponents
People from Pabna District